On Funeral Wings is the seventh album by Runemagick. It was released in 2004 through Aftermath Music.

Track listing
 "Monolithic Death" – 4:19
 "Rise of the Second Moon" – 3:30
 "On Funeral Wings" – 4:36
 "Dragon of Doom" – 9:31
 "Hyperion" – 0:49
 "Ocean Demon" – 6:52
 "Emperor of the Underworld" – 5:35
 "Trifid Nebula" – 2:00
 "The Doomsday Scythe" – 8:19
 "Riders of Endtime" – 5:38
 "In a Darkened Tomb" – 8:22
 "Black Star Abyss" – 8:31
 "Wizard with the Magick Runes" – 5:47

Credits
 Nicklas Rudolfsson - Vocals, Guitar
 Emma Karlsson - Bass
 Daniel Moilanen - Drums

Runemagick albums
2004 albums